Boljevići may refer to:
 Boljevići (Bratunac), Bosnia and Herzegovina
 Boljevići (Bar Municipality), Montenegro